Democracy in Deficit: The Political Legacy of Lord Keynes is a book by American economists James M. Buchanan and Richard E. Wagner originally published in 1977.

Contents
The book consists of 12 chapters:
 What Hath Keynes Wrought?
 The Old-Time Fiscal Religion
 First, the Academic Scribblers
 The Spread of the New Gospel
 Assessing the Damages
 The Presuppositions of Harvey Road
 Keynesian Economics in Democratic Politics
 Money-Financed Deficits and Political Democracy
 Institutional Constraints and Political Choice
 Alternative Budgetary Rules
 What about Full Employment?
 A Return to Fiscal Principle

References 

1977 books
Economics books